Anoop Kumar Gupta is an Indian politician and was a member of the 16th Legislative Assembly in India. He used to represent the Maholi constituency of Uttar Pradesh and is a member of the Samajwadi Party political party.

Early life and education
Anoop Kumar Gupta is the son of Om Prakash Gupta and was born in Sitapur district. He attended the R.M.P. Snatkottar Mahavidyalaya and is a graduate.

Political career and business
Anoop Kumar Gupta has been a MLA for one term. He represented the Maholi constituency and is a member of the Samajwadi Party political party.

Posts held

See also
 Maholi (Assembly constituency)
 Sixteenth Legislative Assembly of Uttar Pradesh
 Uttar Pradesh Legislative Assembly

References 

1970 births
Living people
People from Sitapur district
Uttar Pradesh MLAs 2012–2017
Samajwadi Party politicians from Uttar Pradesh